Fausto Ferrari (born 9 March 1980) is an Italian footballer who plays for Serie D club Fiorenzuola.

Biography
Born in Pavullo nel Frignano, Emilia–Romagna, Ferrari started his professional career at Carpi, then moved to regional capital side Bologna. In January 2000, he was loaned to Pisa, then spent 2000–01 season at Lucchese and Montichiari. In mid-2001 he moved to Sassuolo in co-ownership deal, which in June 2002 Bologna gave up the remain 50% registration rights to Sassuolo. However, he moved to Brescello and scored a career high of 10 league goals. In July 2003 he was signed by Serie B side Ascoli but loaned to Rosetana and Gubbio. He failed to score regularly and in mid-2004 sold to Pavia in another co-ownership deal. At Pavia and San Marino Calcio, Ferrari did not score either and Ascoli gave up the rights in June 2005.

He then moved to Valenzana and finally found his scoring shoes in 2006–07 Serie C2 season. In the next season he was re-signed by Montichiari, by-then a Serie D team. He scored 22 league goals and Montichiari finished as the losing semi-finalists of promotion playoffs. However, as some team in Lega Pro was expelled due to financial problems, Montichiari promoted back to professional league to fill the vacancy. He scored 21 goals in 2008–09 Lega Pro Seconda Divisione, however he did not score in relegation playoffs and Montichiari relegated. In 2009–10 Serie D he scored 26 goals and promoted as Group C champion.

On 23 July 2010 he was signed by Prima Divisione club Lumezzane in 2-year contract., which he lasted played in that level in 2004–05. He scored 10 league goals as team top-scorer. On 27 June 2011 he added one more year to his current contract to 30 June 2013.

Ferrari left for Alessandria in another temporary deal on 3 July 2013.

References

External links
 
 
 Football.it Profile 
 Lumezzane Profile 

Italian footballers
A.C. Carpi players
Bologna F.C. 1909 players
Pisa S.C. players
S.S.D. Lucchese 1905 players
A.C. Montichiari players
U.S. Sassuolo Calcio players
Ascoli Calcio 1898 F.C. players
A.S. Gubbio 1910 players
F.C. Pavia players
A.S.D. Victor San Marino players
Valenzana Mado players
F.C. Lumezzane V.G.Z. A.S.D. players
U.S. Alessandria Calcio 1912 players
Association football forwards
Sportspeople from the Province of Modena
1980 births
Living people
Footballers from Emilia-Romagna